Edward Adrian Guardado (born October 2, 1970) is a former Major League Baseball relief pitcher and current bullpen coach. He was named as a bullpen coach for the Twins in 2014.

His common nickname is "Everyday Eddie", a testament to his durable arm during his first stint with the Twins. Over Eddie's career, he appeared in 908 games. Only 22 other pitchers have appeared in more games.

Professional career

Minnesota Twins
Guardado was drafted by the Minnesota Twins in the 21st round (570th overall) of the 1990 Major League Baseball draft. For several years, the Twins attempted to use Guardado as a starter, but in 1996, he was converted exclusively to a relief pitcher and did not start another Major League game. That season, he led the majors in games pitched with 83. In September 2001, Guardado became the Twins' closer, replacing LaTroy Hawkins. In 2002, he broke Rick Aguilera's 11-year-old Twins team record for games saved, saving 45 games. He followed that up with 41 saves in 2003. After that season, he became a free agent.

Seattle Mariners
On December 9, 2003, Guardado signed a one-year contract with the Seattle Mariners worth a guaranteed $13 million. The deal also included player and team options for the 2005 and 2006 seasons. In 2004, Guardado saved 18 games and posted a 2.78 earned run average in 41 appearances, but suffered a torn rotator cuff and missed the last two months of the season. In 2005, he set the Mariners' record for consecutive saves at 27, which was later broken by J. J. Putz. On May 4, 2006, after three blown saves in less than three weeks, Guardado was temporarily removed from the closer role with the Mariners. Manager Mike Hargrove stated, "We're just trying to get him to step back from the edge a little bit, get himself going a little bit so we can get him back out there again and be the closer like we know he can."

Cincinnati Reds 
On July 6, 2006, Guardado was traded to the Cincinnati Reds along with cash considerations in exchange for minor league pitcher Travis Chick. He converted eight of his first nine save situations with the Reds. In August, Guardado was placed on the disabled list after injuring his elbow. He later underwent Tommy John surgery in September, causing him to miss the rest of the season.

On February 5, 2007, Guardado returned to the Reds and signed a minor league contract with an invitation to spring training. He made his season debut on August 9 after an intense rehab, giving up two hits and a sacrifice fly that allowed the Los Angeles Dodgers to tie the game at 4–4. The Dodgers eventually won 5–4 in 11 innings.

Later career

On January 11, 2008, Guardado signed a one-year contract with the Texas Rangers. On August 25, 2008, Guardado was traded back to the Minnesota Twins for minor league pitcher Mark Hamburger. On February 3, 2009, Guardado returned to the Rangers on a minor league contract and was invited to spring training. In 48 games with the Rangers in 2009, Guardado went 1–2 with a 4.46 ERA.

After considering retirement during the 2009-10 offseason, Guardado decided to come back to baseball by agreeing to terms on a minor league deal with the Washington Nationals on December 26, 2009. On March 11, 2010, Guardado was released by the Nationals. In August, he acknowledged that his playing days had come to an end, saying "I'm looking to add another chapter in my life, and that's to be a father to my three children, which I absolutely love." Through 2021, he holds the MLB record for the longest streak without allowing a triple: it was 551 games, dating to the end of his career. The last person to hit a triple off Guardado was Tony Graffanino back in September 1999.

Post-Major League career
Guardado previously served as a special assistant for the Twins during Spring Training and coaches minor league pitchers.

On January 25, 2013, Guardado was elected to the Minnesota Twins Hall Of Fame along with long-time Media Relations Director, Tom Mee.

In the summer of 2014, he was the head coach for the Tustin, California Little League All-Stars. On November 19, 2014, Guardado was named bullpen coach for the Minnesota Twins. He was fired on October 31, 2018.

Personal life
He is married to Lisa Limbaugh and the couple have three children. Their oldest son, Niko, is a cast member on the 2020 TV series Party of Five.

References

External links

1970 births
Living people
American baseball players of Mexican descent
American League All-Stars
American League saves champions
Baseball players from California
Cincinnati Reds players
Dayton Dragons players
Delta College Mustangs baseball players
Elizabethton Twins players
Kenosha Twins players
Louisville Bats players
Major League Baseball bullpen coaches
Major League Baseball pitchers
Minnesota Twins coaches
Minnesota Twins players
Nashville Xpress players
New Britain Rock Cats players
Salt Lake Buzz players
Seattle Mariners players
Texas Rangers players
Visalia Oaks players
Anchorage Glacier Pilots players